Veliyannoor  is a village in Kottayam district in the state of Kerala, India.

Demographics
 India census, Veliyannoor had a population of 10156 with 5114 males and 5042 females.

References

Villages in Kottayam district